Agromyces luteolus is a bacterium from the genus of Agromyces which has been isolated from the rhizosphere and soil from the tree Sonneratia alba from Okinawa in Japan.

References 

Microbacteriaceae
Bacteria described in 2001